Barbaloba jubae is a moth in the family Blastobasidae. It is found in Costa Rica.

The length of the forewings is 5.6–6 mm. The forewings are pale brown intermixed with brownish-grey scales. The hindwings are pale brown.

Etymology
The specific epithet is derived from the Latin word for mane and refers to the setose (bristled) lobelike process originating from the ventral part of the valva of the male genitalia.

References

Moths described in 2013
Blastobasidae